This is a list of active duty United States Marine Corps major generals collected from publicly available and accessible information.

List of two-star positions

Department of Defense

United States Marine Corps

Headquarters Marine Corps

Supporting establishment

Operating forces

United States Navy

List of pending appointments

See also
List of active duty United States four-star officers
List of active duty United States three-star officers
List of active duty United States Army major generals
List of active duty United States rear admirals
List of active duty United States Air Force major generals
List of active duty United States Space Force general officers
List of active duty United States senior enlisted leaders and advisors
List of current United States National Guard major generals
List of United States Army four-star generals
List of United States Marine Corps four-star generals
List of United States Navy four-star admirals
List of United States Air Force four-star generals
List of United States Coast Guard four-star admirals

References

active duty United States Marine Corps major generals
Two-star officers
United States Marine Corps
United States Marine Corps major generals